The main U.S. Post Office in Newburgh, New York is located at 215-217 Liberty Street two blocks north of Broadway. It serves the 12550 ZIP Code, which covers the city and nearby areas of the Town of Newburgh. There is a branch station located on Broadway in the western neighborhood of the city.  The building itself is a two-story brick structure built in the early 1930s. It was designed under the supervision of James Wetmore, supervising architect for the Treasury Department at the time, and takes a Colonial Revival style.

It was added to the National Register of Historic Places in 1989; it is also a contributing property to the Montgomery-Grand-Liberty Streets Historic District.

References

Newburgh
Buildings and structures in Orange County, New York
National Register of Historic Places in Orange County, New York
Government buildings completed in 1931
Newburgh, New York
Historic district contributing properties in New York (state)
Buildings and structures in Newburgh, New York